Munj or Mownj may refer to:
 Munj, Fars
 Munj, Kohgiluyeh and Boyer-Ahmad
 Munj, Mazandaran
 Vakpati Munja, a 10th-century Indian king; also known as Munj in Hindi

See also
 Monj (disambiguation)